Aliguccio Ciccarelli, also known as Ciccarello d'Aliguzio (15th century) is an Italian painter of the 15th century, allegedly active in Loreto, Camerino, and Ancona. Little biographical details are known and his identity is difficult to assign with any certainty to any work. Corrado Ferretti cites a notes by Amico Ricci and Giuseppe Vogel<ref>Vogel in De Eccclesiis Recan. et Laur. Earumq. Episcop. Commentarius Historicus. Tom. I page 167.</ref> who saw a contemporary document by the lawyer from Recanati, Ser Giacomo di Maestro Pietruccio, about a painter (1429) in the Basilica in Loreto.

Vogel's documents that the procurator of Filippo Maria Visconti, Duke of Milan, a man named Giovanni de Carnago, commissioned from Aliguccio a painting of the Adoration of the Magi to hang in pertinentiis'' in the Basilica della Santa Casa in Loreto. Ricci's document stated similar commission for the price of 50 gold florins.

References

People from Ancona
15th-century Italian painters
Quattrocento painters
Italian male painters
Year of birth missing